Heroína Island is a small island in Antarctica, marking the northeast end of the Danger Islands, east-southeast of Joinville Island. It was named by the Argentine Antarctic Expedition, 1948–49, after the expedition ship Heroína, the name being approved by the Advisory Committee on Antarctic Names in 1993.

Geology
Heroina Island is composed of Mesozoic granodiorite, related to the great Mesozoic Andean subduction zone that extended from here to Central America.

See also 
 List of Antarctic and sub-Antarctic islands

References

Islands of the Joinville Island group